The blue-backed tanager (Cyanicterus cyanicterus) is a species of South American  bird in the tanager family Thraupidae.  It is the only member of the genus Cyanicterus.

It is found in Brazil, French Guiana, Guyana, Suriname, and Venezuela. Its natural habitat is subtropical or tropical moist lowland forests.

Taxonomy
The blue-backed tanager was formally described in 1819 by the French ornithologist Louis Jean Pierre Vieillot under the binomial name Pyranga cyanicterus. The type locality is Cayenne in French Guiana. This species is now the only member of the genus Cyanicterus that was introduced by Charles Lucien Bonaparte in 1850. The word cyanicterus  is formed from the Ancient Greek kuanos meaning "dark-blue" and ikteros meaning  "jaundice-yellow". The blue-backed tanager is monotypic: no subspecies are recognised.

References

blue-backed tanager
Birds of the Guianas
blue-backed tanager
Taxa named by Louis Jean Pierre Vieillot
Taxonomy articles created by Polbot